A mechanical seal is a device that helps join systems and mechanisms together by preventing leakage (e.g. in a pumping system), containing pressure, or excluding contamination. The effectiveness of a seal is dependent on adhesion in the case of sealants and compression in the case of gaskets.  The seals are installed in pumps in a wide range of industries including chemicals, water supply, paper production, food processing and many other applications.

A stationary seal may also be referred to as 'packing'.

Seal types:
Induction sealing or cap sealing
Adhesive, sealant
Bodok seal, a specialized gas sealing washer for medical applications
Bonded seal, also  known as Dowty seal or Dowty washer. A type of washer with integral gasket, widely used to provide a seal at the entry point of a screw or bolt 
Bridgman seal, a piston sealing mechanism that creates a high pressure reservoir from a lower pressure source
Bung
Compression seal fitting
Diaphragm seal
Ferrofluidic seal
Gasket or Mechanical packing
Flange gasket
O-ring
O-ring boss seal
Piston ring
Glass-to-metal seal
Glass-ceramic-to-metal seals
Heat seal
Hose coupling, various types of hose couplings
Hermetic seal
Hydrostatic seal
Hydrodynamic seal
Inflatable seal Seals that inflate and deflate in three basic directions of operation: the axial direction, the radial-in direction, and the radial-out direction. Each of these inflation directions has their own set of performance parameters for measurements such as the height of inflation and the center-line bend radius that the seal can negotiate. Inflatable seals can be used for numerous applications with difficult sealing issues. 
Labyrinth seal A seal which creates a tortuous path for the liquid to flow through
Lid (container)
Rotating face mechanical seal
Face seal
Plug
Radial shaft seal
Trap (plumbing) (siphon trap)
Stuffing box (mechanical packing)
Wiper seal
Dry gas seal

See also
 Leakage (chemistry)

References